The Calf Pasture Pumping Station Complex is a historic sewage treatment facility at 435 Mount Vernon Street on Columbia Point in the Dorchester section of Boston, Massachusetts which was built in the 1880s.

The surrounding community was, in the 17th and 18th centuries, and through to the mid-19th century, a calf pasture: a place where nearby Dorchester residents took their calves for grazing. It was largely an uninhabited marshland on the Dorchester peninsula. Its size was originally .
 

In the 1880s, the calf pasture was used as a Boston sewer line and pumping station, known as the Calf Pasture Pumping Station Complex. This large granite structure, the first sewage treatment station built in the city, was built in 1883.  It still stands and in its time was a model for treating sewage and helping to promote cleaner and healthier urban living conditions. It pumped waste to a remote treatment facility on Moon Island in Boston Harbor, and served as a model for other systems worldwide. This system remained in active use and was the Boston Sewer system's headworks, handling all of the city's sewage, until 1968 when a new treatment facility was built on Deer Island. The pumping station is also architecturally significant as a Richardsonian Romanesque designed by the then Boston city architect, George Clough. It is also the only remaining 19th century building on Columbia Point.

The facility was listed on the National Register of Historic Places in 1990. This building is currently under study as a Boston Landmark by the Boston Landmarks Commission. In January 2020, the University of Massachusetts Building Authority issued a request for information from developers to restore the facility and to construct a mixed-use facility on an adjacent 10-acre site, receiving eight proposals in response by the following September. In July 2021, UMass officials issued a request for proposal for the facility and the adjacent site.

See also
National Register of Historic Places listings in southern Boston, Massachusetts

References

External links 
Histories of the Calf Pasture Pumping Station - Blog created by graduate students in the history department at UMass Boston
Photographs of the Calf Pasture Pumping Station - Northeast Architecture, architectural photography and history
Boston 1903 map - see the Calf Pasture on Columbia Point in the lower middle right hand side just above Savin Hill

Infrastructure completed in 1883
Sewage pumping stations
Industrial buildings and structures on the National Register of Historic Places in Massachusetts
George A. Clough buildings
Buildings and structures in Boston
National Register of Historic Places in Boston
Dorchester, Boston
Sewerage infrastructure in the United States